The Kingdom of Fife AFA is a football league competition for amateur clubs in the Fife peninsula of Scotland. The league was created in 2017 with the merger of the Kingdom Caledonian Amateur Football Association and Fife Amateur Football Association. The association is affiliated to the Scottish Amateur Football Association and currently has 33 clubs across three divisions.

2019–20 league members

Premier League
AM Soccer Club
Auchtermuchty Bellvue
Balgonie Scotia
Bowhill Rovers
Cupar Hearts
Fossoway
Greig Park Rangers
Kirkcaldy YMCA
Kennoway
Leven United
Lumphinnans United
Pittenweem Rovers

Championship
Burntisland United
Eastvale
Glenrothes
Hearts of Beath
Kelty
Kinross
Markinch
Rosebank Rangers
Rosyth
St Monans Swallows

First Division
Duloch
Falkland
Fife Athletic
Fife Thistle
Freuchie
Kennoway Star Hearts
Kinross Colts
Lochgelly United
Methilhill Strollers & East Fife
St Andrews Colts
Strathmiglo United

Previous Members
Aberdour SDC
Kirkland Villa AFC
Kirkcaldy Rovers
Lomond Victoria AFC
St Andrews AFC
FC Bayside
Strathmiglo United
Kingdom Athletic
Glenrothes Strollers (applied to join the East of Scotland Football League, but were rejected)

Champions

References

External links
Official website
Fife Football Forum

Football leagues in Scotland
Football in Fife
2017 establishments in Scotland
Amateur association football in Scotland
Sports organizations established in 2017